Euzebya is a genus of Gram-positive bacteria.

References

Actinomycetota
Bacteria genera